may refer to:

, name used from 1947 to 1956 for the former 
, launched in 1959

Ship names